The Revolution Will Not Be Televised is a poem and song by Gil Scott-Heron.

The Revolution Will Not Be Televised is also the name of:
The Revolution Will Not Be Televised (album), a 1974 compilation album by Gil Scott-Heron
The Revolution Will Not Be Televised (film), a television documentary film about Hugo Chávez during the Venezuelan coup attempt of 2002
The Revolution Will Not Be Televised: Democracy, the Internet, and the Overthrow of Everything, a book by Joe Trippi about Howard Dean's 2004 presidential campaign
The Revolution Will Be Televised, a BBC television show

See also
Moulding of a Fool by Paul Heaton and Jacqui Abbott, which repeatedly uses the phrase The revolution won't be televised/and neither will your death in the lyrics
Summer of Soul (...Or, When the Revolution Could Not Be Televised), a 2021 American documentary film directed by Ahmir "Questlove" Thompson